Mohamed Abdeldjalil Bourguieg (born August 31, 1996) is an Algerian male artistic gymnast, He participated in two editions of the World Championships (2014 in Nanjing, China, and 2015 in Glasgow, Scotland), and qualified for the 2016 Summer Olympics, securing one of the spots available at the Olympic Test Event in Rio de Janeiro.

References

External links 
 

1996 births
Living people
Algerian male artistic gymnasts
People from Boufarik
Gymnasts at the 2016 Summer Olympics
Olympic gymnasts of Algeria
African Games gold medalists for Algeria
African Games medalists in gymnastics
African Games silver medalists for Algeria
Competitors at the 2015 African Games
Competitors at the 2019 African Games
Islamic Solidarity Games competitors for Algeria
21st-century Algerian people
Gymnasts at the 2022 Mediterranean Games
Mediterranean Games competitors for Algeria